The Cosapilla River is a river of Chile and Bolivia and is part of the boundary. It is also called Caquena and, in Bolivia, Cosapa (see map). From its source in the Parinacota Province, the river flows north, is part of the Chile-Bolivia boundary and then flows in the Bolivian Department of Oruro.

The Caquena river has its source at the Payachata volcanic group, flows to north, it is part of the Chile-Bolivia boundary, and meets the Cosapilla and takes this name.

See also
Bolivia–Chile border
List of rivers of Chile

References
 Hidrografía Regional del Altiplano de Chile
 Plan de acción estragtégico para el desarrollo hídrico de la Región de Arica y Parinacota, retrieved on 15 June 2012, in Spanish Language
 DIAGNÓSTICO DEL RIEGO Y DRENAJE EN LA I REGIÓN

Rivers of Chile
Rivers of Arica y Parinacota Region